The Cascade Cereal Company was a flour and cereal milling company in Tacoma, Washington. Originally named the Cascade Oatmeal Company, it was the first oat and cereal mill in the American west. Founded by Washington state pioneer John Wesley Berry in 1888, the company expanded quickly, opening additional mills and warehouses. By 1900, there were four more milling companies in Tacoma, and the Cascade Cereal Company was second in sales behind the Puget Sound Mills Company. The Cascade Cereal Company bid and won contracts to supply state schools and hospitals, and exported products to southeast Asia.

During the panic of 1893, John Berry lost control of the company. Under the supervision of the new president, J. G. Deming, he proceeded as its manager. In 1903, the company was bought by Albers Brothers, and later became part of the Albers Brothers Milling Company.

A fire on July 24, 1903 destroyed the company's headquarters and main mill. The extensive damage wasn't fully covered by insurance, resulting in heavy losses to the owners. Eventually, the plant was rebuilt in 1905 as Albers Brothers Mill of Tacoma, and in 1984, the building was added to the National Register of Historic Places. The same year, the Nestle Corporation bought the Albers trademark to produce grits and cornmeal under the Albers brand name.

History

Cascade Oatmeal Company

The Cascade Cereal Company started from one mill, built by John Wesley Berry in 1888, the first oat and cereal mill in the west. The five-story building occupied a  area on Jefferson Avenue in Tacoma.

The Cascade Oatmeal Company was officially incorporated in August 1892 with $100,000 ($2,600,00 in 2020 dollars) in capital. John Berry became its president, and one of the proprietors was his brother-in-law, Charles W. Quinn.

In 1892, the Cascade Oatmeal mill became the first in Washington state to have weevils in their wheat. In an attempt to retain the price of the product and insurance rates, the information was withheld for some time. However, later the company managers broke their silence. Their official statement was that the weevils came to the area in San Francisco wheat, and that their local product was free of weevils. Another Washingtonian businessman called the attempt to conceal the truth "nonsense," arguing that there was no chance the product could stay free of the pests forever. The company experienced more difficulty when John Berry purchased a share in the Oakesdale Milling Company. The partnership didn't work, and both the Tacoma and Oakesdale  mills were temporarily closed.

In 1893, a trade relationship was established between America and southeast Asia. During this time, the flour business was considered very profitable, as flour was one of the most demanded products. Berry rushed to build an additional flour mill in Tacoma, faster than similar arrangements were made in Seattle. The mill was to be located near the Cascade Oatmeal mill on Jefferson Avenue, with a production capacity of  a day.

Cascade Cereal Company

In 1895, the Cascade Cereal Company was incorporated, replacing the Cascade Oatmeal Company. Its capital was $10,000 ($260,000), which consisted of 100 shares of $100 ($2,600) each. The incorporators for the new company were John Wesley Berry, M. E. Quinn, and N. M. L. Berry.

The U.S. Panic of 1893 caused a change in management. John Berry lost control of the company, and later, worked as its manager. In 1900,  J. G. Deming was president of the company, J. J. Deming was vice president, L. D. Coates secretary and treasurer, and John Berry was a manager. Prosser, one of the founders of the Washington State Historical Society, however, stated, that by 1903, Berry regained his original share of the company.

Over the years, the mill improved and expanded. Prosser stated that the mill was fitted with "high-grade" equipment, and produced "the very best rolled oats, cereals and flours" of that time. In 1900, under the new management, a new warehouse was erected, with the capacity to store 20,000 sacks of oats. Also, a new plant was built to produce pearl barley.

The annual output value during 1900 was estimated at $300,000 ($785,000). At the time, the Cascade Cereal Company was one of five milling companies in Tacoma. Their combined output was appraised at $2,000,000 ($52,000,000). The leader in the field was the Puget Sound Flouring Mills, with an output value of $1,500,00 ($39,000,000); the Cascade Cereal Company was in the second place, with a value of $300,000 ($785,000).

In 1900–1901, the company bid and won a number of government contracts to supply state institutions, including the Western Washington hospital, the state reform school, and the Soldier's home.

In 1902, the Cascade Cereal Company was bought by Albers Brothers. Bernard Albers became the president, owning a controlling share of the company. Under his management, the company produced 150 barrels of rolled oats and 125 barrels of flour daily.

Besides the Cascade Cereal Company, Albers owned a number of other companies across the U.S., and on March 1, 1903, he reorganized them into the historic Albers Brothers Milling Company.

The fire and aftermath

On July 24, 1903, the Cascade Cereal Company was destroyed by fire. A number of other establishments and residential buildings, were also either destroyed or damaged by fire and water. It took 35 minutes for the fire to bring down the company's mill building and then move to adjacent buildings. The fire was extinguished about 30 minutes later.

At the time, the mill's value was estimated at $90,000 ($2,300,000), of which $30,000 ($785,000) was invested in product stock. The insurance for the mill was appraised at about $54,000 ($1,400,000), and the loss value for the building at $150,000 ($3,900,000).

In a San Juan Islander news note, the fire was called "one of the hottest in the history of the city." The statement was also supported by the annual report of the Tacoma fire department. It stated, that the fire, in fact, was one of the four "largest fires the department ever had to handle," and the total loss for the city was appraised at $97,000($2,500,000).

The generally accepted cause of the fire was a spark from a passing locomotive, that ignited the shavings in one of the Cascade mill rooms on the ground floor.

Later years

In 1905, the plant was rebuilt under the name of Albers Brothers Mill of Tacoma. Bernard Albers was the president of the company until his death in 1908. In 1984, the company building in Tacoma, which was considered "the best physical reminder of the Albers Brothers Milling Company," was added to the National Register of Historic Places. In the same year, the Nestle Corporation bought the Albers trademark and started grits and cornmeal production under the Albers brand name.

See also 
 John Wesley Berry
 Albers Brothers Milling Company
 Albers Brothers Mill
 Western State Hospital (Washington)

Notes

References

Literature cited 

Flour mills in the United States
Buildings and structures in Tacoma, Washington
Grinding mills in Washington (state)
1880s establishments in Washington (state)
National Register of Historic Places in Tacoma, Washington
Nestlé brands